Arnaldo da Silveira (6 August 1894 – 24 June 1980), known as Arnaldo, was a Brazilian footballer. He played in 14 matches for the Brazil national football team from 1914 to 1919. He was also part of Brazil's squad for the 1916 South American Championship.

References

External links
 

1894 births
1980 deaths
Brazilian footballers
Brazil international footballers
Place of birth missing
Association footballers not categorized by position